Allied Bank Limited cricket team were a first-class cricket side that competed in Pakistani domestic cricket from 1978-79 to 2004-05. They were sponsored by Allied Bank Limited.

They played 116 first-class matches, with 43 wins, 31 losses and 42 draws. They beat Pakistan International Airlines in the final of the Patron's Trophy in 1994-95.

The highest score for Allied Bank Limited was 300 by Rameez Raja against Habib Bank Limited in 1994-95. The best innings bowling figures were 9 for 51 by Aaqib Javed against Habib Bank Limited in 1996-97.

Honours
  Patron's Trophy (1) 
 1994–95

See also
 List of Allied Bank Limited cricketers

References

External links
 Lists of matches played by Allied Bank Limited at CricketArchive

Pakistani first-class cricket teams
Former senior cricket clubs of Pakistan